Cornish wrestling is a form of wrestling that has been established in Cornwall for many centuries and possibly longer. It is similar to the Breton Gouren wrestling style. It is colloquially known as "wrasslin’" in the Cornish dialect of English; historically, this usage is attested by Chaucer, Shakespeare and Drayton.

The referee is known as a 'stickler', and it is claimed that the popular meaning of the word as a 'pedant' originates from this usage.

Cornish wrestling is a national sport of Cornwall, which spread throughout the British Isles and then, along with the Cornish diaspora, to such places as the United States, Australia, Mexico, New Zealand and South Africa.

Introduction to the rules of competition
The objective of Cornish wrestling is to throw ones opponent and cause them to land as flat as possible on the back. Each of the wrestlers wears a ‘jacket’ of tough make and material, enabling them to better grip their opponent. Grabbing of the wrists or fingers is forbidden as well as holding below the waist. All holds are to be taken upon the jacket, although the flat of the hand is allowed to be used to push or deflect an opponent. Three sticklers watch and control each bout, keeping score of points.

Four pins are located on the back of a wrestler, two at the shoulders and two just above the buttocks. A wrestler scores points by throwing their opponent onto their back, the number of pins hitting the floor being the number of points scored. If a wrestler manages to score with three or four pins this is called a ‘Back’ and the bout is then finished, with the throwing wrestler as the winner. The sticklers  each raise their sticks when they perceive a Back has been achieved. A Back may be awarded by majority, i.e. by two out of the three stickers. If a Back is not awarded, the winner is the wrestler with the most accumulated points within the time limit.

History

Cornish wrestling has a long history, with Geoffrey of Monmouth in Historia Regum Britanniae describing Corineus, the legendary founder of Cornwall, as a man "of great courage and boldness, who, in an encounter with any person, even of gigantic stature, would immediately overthrow him, as if he were a child", and later tells the story of how Corineus wrestled a Cornish giant, Gogmagog or Goemagot upon the cliff top known as Lamm Goemagot.

Thomas Hoby writes that in 1551 at Chastenbriant the French king showed my Lord Marquess of Northampton "great pleasure and disport...sometime with his great boisterlie Bretons wrastling with my lordes yemen of Cornwall, who had much to do to gete the upper hande of them."

Some of the earliest written evidence for wrestling in the West Country comes from a 1612 poem entitled "Poly-Olbion" by Michael Drayton, which gives the names of some Cornish Wrestling throws. Drayton also published a poem in 1627 called The Battle of Agincourt, which concerns the 1415 battle. The poem states that the Cornish men who accompanied Henry V into battle held a banner of two Cornish wrestlers.

Cornish, Devon and Breton wrestlers have long taken part in inter-Celtic matches since at least 1402 and these still occasionally continue. In early times Cornish and Devonian wrestlers often had matches against each other though the rules they followed were not the same. One of these was the notable match between Richard Parkyn and the Devonian John Jordan.

In 1654, Oliver Cromwell and many of his privy council were reported as watching 100 Cornishmen wrestling in Hyde Park, presenting "...great agility of body and most neat and exquisite wrestling at every meeting of one with the other, which was ordered with such dexterity, that it was to show more the strength, vigour and nimbleness of their bodies, than to endanger their persons."

Charles II, along with "a world of lords" and many other spectators, watched a series of wrestling matches in St James' Park in 1669, with a purse of £1000, which saw the "Western men" win.
His Highness York’s great Duke beheld the same
With other persons of renowned fame
Brave Cornishmen, you are to be commended
And will be so until the world is ended.

Sir Thomas Parkyns (1664–1741), known as the Wrestling Baronet, was a devotee of wrestling and organised an annual wrestling match in Bunny Park (prize a gold-laced hat). These matches continued until 1810. His book on the subject The Inn-Play: or, the Cornish Hugg-Wrestler was published in 1713 and reprinted many times.

A contest at Bodmin in 1811 attracted 4,000 spectators, but thereafter interest in the sport waned. James Gerry (of Linkinhorne) and Samuel Rundle (Plymouth) fought for a £20 purse and the championship of Cornwall in 1883 at Liskeard. Lasting just over an hour, the match ended in a draw in the 19th round following Rundle tearing leg muscles. Gerry was reported in The Cornishman newspaper to have vanquished all the best men in America as well as many men in Cornwall, Rundle had beaten nearly all the wrestling men in Devon and Cornwall.

In 1927 William Tregoning Hooper (Bras y Golon) agreed with the Breton Dr. Cottonec of Quimperle that there should be annual wrestling tournaments in which both Cornish and Breton wrestlers would compete. In 1932, the Duke of Cornwall helped fund the competing Cornish wrestlers.

In the 1970s Truro Cathedral School was teaching Cornish wrestling as part of its physical education programme and was the only school in Cornwall to do so.

Traditions

A very old custom was, on the Sunday following a wrestling match or tournament, to wear to church any prizes won. Alternatively they were hung on an inside pillar near the main church door. This custom was especially observed when the victory was within another parish.

There is an ancient custom whereby sticklers of a tournament would appear at church the following Sunday wearing "Christys" (silk top hats) with streamers (silk ribbons).

There are multiple stories of women being capable wrestlers, even more than 200 years ago. For example, Caroline who was taught wrestling by her father and in turn taught her son Joel Andrewartha, who went on to become one of the best wrestlers in Cornwall and beat Polkinhorne. Another example is Lizzie Taylor (1831-1887), known as "Happy Ned" or "Lizzie-poor-Dick", who threw John Lillywhite in a wrestling-bout at Clowance. She was a miner who dressed in men's clothes.

During a match, wrestlers shake hands before every hitch.

Prior to the mid-1800s, competitors had to renounce the use of magic before the start of a tournament.

Traditionally wrestlers would challenge each other to wrestling matches by throwing their hat into the ring. The idiom may come from this practice.

In Cornwall, youngsters used to play the game of "shuffle hats and wrastle", where they would throw their hats into a ring, with their owners wrestling off in accordance with the pairing of the hats.

There had been a custom of "begging the ring" whereby old or injured wrestlers would walk around the ring begging for alms. This was replaced by a wrestlers' benevolent fund in 1926 and then by the welfare state.

Wrestling matches were once played in churchyards, but in 1297 the Bishop of Exeter banned it from such places in Devon and Cornwall.

In late Victorian times women were briefly banned from matches, as men often wrestled in their long johns, which was not considered respectable.

Gold laced hats were often used as first place prizes for Cornish wrestling tournaments. It was said that wearers of such hats were immune from the attentions of the press gang.

Wrestlers who were knocked senseless in bouts would often be treated by being "bled" on site if there was a doctor at hand.

In the mid-1800s though to the early 1900s, extra trains were laid on going to and from towns where Cornish wrestling tournaments were being held. In the early 1900s this was extended to extra bus services.

Until 1927 there was no time limit for Cornish wrestling matches and there are records of matches taking many hours and even having to be reconvened the next day. Note that in 1927 the rule became best 2 falls in 20 minutes, but there was much resistance to this change as it was perceived that often the worse player won these matches. This was changed to the current rules of two, ten minute, rounds with points being used to determine the winner if no back is scored. However, his time limit lapsed in the 1940s, was proposed to be reinstated in 1956, but was only reinstated in 1967.

In the early 1800s there were two distinct styles of wrestling. Wrestlers who fought in the Western style included Parkyn and wrestlers who fought with the Eastern style included the Truscotts. This distinction had disappeared by the end of the 1800s.

The wrestler's motto

Gwari hweg yw gwari teg

English Translation: Fair play is sweet play.

The wrestler's oath

War ow enor ha war enor ow bro, 
my a de omdewlel heb trayturi na garowder, 
hag avel oll ow lelder my a ystynn ow leuv dhe’m kontrari. 
Gans geryow ow hendasow: “gwari hweg yw gwari teg”.

English Translation:
On my honour and the honour of my country, 
I swear to wrestle without treachery or brutality 
and in token of my sincerity I offer my hand to my opponent. 
In the words of my forefathers: “gwari hweg yw gwari teg”.

Governing bodies
There has been significant disagreement, over time, as to which were the ruling governing bodies in the sport and also differences in the precise nature of the rules.  This has resulted in simultaneous claimants for world, national and regional titles.

Governing bodies outside Cornwall

The Devon and Cornish wrestling Society was formed in 1849.

The Western Counties Wrestling Association was formed in 1877

Worldwide, various regional bodies have governed local Cornish wrestling tournaments or matches.  Examples include:
 The Royal Marine Light Infantry for a tournament in Japan (1872);
 The Ivey Athletic Club for tournaments in Michigan, United States;
 The Brotton wrestling committee for Cornish wrestling in Yorkshire;
 The Bendigo Amateur Wrestling Association in Bendigo, Australia;
 The Cornish Association of South Africa;
 Taunton Athletic club in Somerset;
 St Budeaux and District Wrestling Committee for local tournaments in Devon;
 The Duke of Cornwall's Light Infantry in India;
 The Cornish Porcupine wrestling club in Canada;
 Pachuca Athletic Club in Mexico.
 Morro Velho mines in Brazil.

Cornwall and Devon wrestling Society

The Cornwall and Devon wrestling Society (also known as the Devon and Cornwall wrestling Society) was formed in 1752, running tournaments and matches in London, often at Hackney Wick. Open competitions were held, awarding significant belts and prizes funded by the patrons. However, only natives of Cornwall were permitted to compete for the Great Duke of Cornwall cup.

Patrons of the Cornwall and Devon wrestling Society
 The Prince of Wales for many years.
 Sir Arthur William Buller from 1868.

Governing bodies inside Cornwall

The different regional associations within Cornwall merged into the Cornwall County Wrestling Association ("CCWA") in September 1923, under the presidency of Lord St Levan, to help standardize the rules, facilitate the competing of Duchy championships, mitigate the risk of clashing tournaments and  promote Cornish Wrestling throughout Cornwall and indeed Worldwide. When the CCWA was formed there were only 9 affiliated local associations, but by 1925 there were over 50. Note that the Newquay and Port Isaac associations initially indicated that they wanted nothing to do with the CCWA.

In 1928, William Tregonning Hooper initiated inter-Celtic tournaments between the CCWA and its counterpart in Brittany, as the similarities of Breton and Cornish wrestling are sufficient for successful competitions to be held between the two.

In 1930, the CCWA had financial difficulties resulting in suspension of activities and the belts and cups being seized by the bank. As a result, belts and cups were not awarded.

In 1932, the CCWA was refinanced, with help from the London Cornish Association, Federation of Old Cornwall Societies, Viscount Clifden, the Western Morning News and the Duke of Cornwall, and the belts and cups were retrieved from the bank. In 1933 the CCWA changed its name to the Cornish Wrestling Association ("CWA") and adopted a rule to limit rounds to 15 minutes.

In 1933 various local wrestling associations had competitions unaffiliated to the CWA, culminating with St Mawgan holding a championship of Cornwall, "under the old Cornish wrestling rules".

The East Cornwall Wrestling Federation ("ECWF") was formed in 1934, at least in part to hold competitions under more traditional rules (the time limit being a key issue). The ECWF also complained that the CWA had preferred placing championship tournaments in West Cornwall and had preferred selecting wrestlers from West Cornwall to represent Cornwall in the inter-Celtic competition. The ECWF held rival championship titles of heavyweight, middleweight and lightweight champion in the "Old Cornish Style". In 1934, the CWA initially suspended wrestlers involved with ECWF competitions. This rule was suspended in 1936, but re-instigated in 1938.

In 1936 the CWA removed the time limit to matches.

In 1946, the ECWF was absorbed by the CWA, who have overseen almost all tournaments since. A current example of an exception to this is the annual St Mawgan tournament.

In 1994 the CWA opened competitions to women.

In 2004 the CWA became affiliated with the British Wrestling Association.

Patrons of the CCWA/CWA

Lord St Levan between 1923 and 1934.
Commander Sir Edward Nicholl from 1923 for many years.
The Prince of Wales between 1932 and 1935.
Sir John Langdon Bonython between 1932 and 1935.
Viscount Clifden between 1932 and 1934.

Notable people who were also Cornish wrestlers 
 King Henry VIII was a confident wrestler, but he lost a hitch with King Francis I at the Field of the Cloth of Gold (possibly with a Flying Mare), after his Cornish wrestlers had soundly defeated Francis' Breton wrestlers.
 John Wesley had been a Cornish wrestler in his youth.
 According to his brother, Sir Humphry Davy was a Cornish wrestler in his youth. Davy was a Cornish chemist, inventor, a baronet, President of the Royal Society (PRS), Member of the Royal Irish Academy (MRIA), Fellow of the Geological Society (FGS), and a member of the American Philosophical Society (elected 1810).
 Cornwall's favourite son, the inventor Richard Trevithick, was a champion Cornish Wrestler.

 Tom Molineaux the famous bare knuckle boxer entered Cornish wrestling tournaments in England when touring in the early 1800s.
 Billy Bray the famous unconventional Cornish preacher was a Cornish wrestler.
 Abraham Lincoln, the president of the United States, was a Cornish wrestler and would practice Cornish wrestling during his work outs in the White House.
 The US president, statesman and soldier Theodore Roosevelt, started training in Cornish wrestling when he was New York governor, where he was taught three times a week by Professor Mike J Dwyer.
 John Lillywhite, the famous cricketer who was in the first England team, competed in Cornish wrestling tournaments in the mid-1800s.
 US Senator, Thomas Kearns, when he moved from Kansas to Utah, went around Cornish mining camps challenging the strongest miners to Cornish wrestling matches for side bets.
 Robert James Fitzsimmons, better known as Bob Fitzsimmons was a Cornish professional boxer who was the sport's first three-division world champion between 1894 and 1903. He knew Cornish wrestling from when he was a boy and used Cornish wrestling tricks in his early finish fights. He usually had a wrestler in his camp while training for a fight.
 Roy Jennings was a rugby player that played for Redruth and the British Lions (touring Australia and New Zealand in 1930), that regularly competed in Cornish wrestling tournaments in the 1930s. He also represented Cornwall in the 1933 inter-Celtic wrestling tournament.
 The actors, Paul Dupuis and Ralph Michael, studied Cornish wrestling under middleweight champion Tom Cundry, for their roles in the film - Johnny Frenchman. Later, Dupuis and Michael were invited to enter the Cornish wrestling festival at Helston.

Notable Cornish wrestlers
Historically, there were simultaneous claimants to world, national and regional titles in Cornish wrestling.  This was driven, at least in part, by there not being agreement concerning the definitive governing bodies in the sport until the 1920s.

Some of these wrestlers also competed in other wrestling styles, or in matches where multiple styles were used.

Algeria
 Mourzouk had a famous Cornish wrestling match with Jack Carkeek in Australia in 1904. He was a champion in Greco-Roman wrestling.

Australia
 Jesse Liddicoat was a very strong immigrant Cornish wrestler.
 Nicholas was Cornish wrestling champion of South Australia in 1842.
 James Chipman was Cornish wrestling champion of South Australia in 1851.
 William Hodge (1817-?), originally from Sithney, was an Australian Cornish wrestling champion in the late 1840s and early 1850s, winning over 80 prizes. He was 5 feet 10 inches high and weighed 174 lbs. He was champion of Australia in 1851, beating James Chipman for the title.
 William Kneebone (1829-1906), was recognised Australian Cornish wrestling champion in the 1850s. He once came home and caught a burglar. He explained the battered state of the burglar to the bench by saying he had given him a Flying Mare.
 Charles Corse (1825-1872), originally from St Neot, Cornwall, was about 6 feet and 15 stone and was a champion Cornish wrestler. In newspaper articles his surname was also spelt 'Coss', 'Cause', 'Cawse', 'Cawrce' and 'Cawrse'. He was a blacksmith and claimed to have thrown Gundry before emigrating. He was champion of Victoria and was Cornish wrestling champion of Australia in 1857. In 1852 he was known as the "Sydney Champion" and beat Hodge in a high-profile challenge match taking the Australian title. He successfully defended the title in 1856 against Burns. He was murdered by being shot in the back of the head.
 Captain James Williams White (1826-1903), born on St Mary's, Isles of Scilly and lived in Burra, South Australia since 1856, was a champion wrestler in the Cornish style.
 Dick Bray, known as "Curley" and weighing about 11 stone, was a champion Australian Cornish wrestler of the 1860s.
 John H Bray, known as Dancing Bray", was a champion wrestler, winning an important competition in 1868.
 Joe Williams, originally from Crowan emigrated to mine in Australia in the mid-1800s. He won the Cornish wrestling championship of Australia, gaining the championship belt and a large gold cup.
 G Philips (1846-1922), was a noted Cornish wrestler in his youth.
 John Thomas (1844-?), known as "Jack" and from Eaglehawk, was heavyweight champion of Australia for many years. His wrestling career spanned from 1871 to 1899. He won over 100 first prizes in England, Victoria, New South Wales, South Australia, Queensland and New Zealand in many wrestling styles.
 Stephens was the lightweight Cornish wrestling champion of Australia in 1879.
 Jack Tamblyn (1849-?), was a champion Cornish wrestler.
 John Walker (1857-1913), known as " Wrastling Jack", was Cornish wrestling champion of the Barrier towards the end of the 1800s. In later life he suffered from lead poisoning.
 Thomas was champion Cornish wrestler of Australia in 1884. He was previously Cumberland and Westmorland wrestling champion.
 Connors claimed to be world Cornish wrestling champion in 1886.
 Jacob Burrows was an Australian Cornish wrestling champion in 1887.
 W Williams was Australian Cornish wrestling champion in 1889.
 Charles Colwell was Australian Cornish wrestling champion in the late 1800s who was especially notable for having only one arm.
 Henry Randall Neilson (1867-1925), known as "Delhi Neilson" and the "Bendigo Boy", was Australian Cornish wrestling champion between 1889 and 1907, weighing 10 st 7 lbs, who was said to have defeated over 400 opponents. He was an Australian rules footballer. In 1908, 1909 and 1910 he was middleweight Cornish wrestling champion of South Africa. He was the Cornish wrestling champion of the Barrier in 1890 and 1891.
 Mons Victor was an Australian champion Cornish wrestler in 1898.
 Harry Pearce, was Australian champion Cornish wrestler from 1897 to 1904.
 Dick Porter became middleweight wrestling champion of Australia, beating Delhi Neilson in 1906.
 Rundle was the 1907 champion of Australia, who also fought in South Africa.
 George Dinnie was the 1907 Cornish wrestling champion of Western Australia.
 Gavin Dickson from Sydney won the Australian Cornish wrestling championship in 2001 in front of 30,000 people at the Cornish festival in Moonta.

Austria
 Fred Oberlander (1911-1996), was born in Vienna and fought successfully in various wrestling styles in Austria, Britain and Canada. He fought in Cornish wrestling tournaments in the 1940s.

Bolivia
 Roeder had a famous wrestling match with Schiller Williams in the 1890s, which he lost.

Brazil
 R Hodge was Morro Velho mines Cornish wrestling champion in 1860.

Canada

 Captain Jack King (1867-?) was born in Bruce Mines, Canada, moved to the USA and eventually lived in Houghton County. He held the world championship from 1895 to 1898 and was known as the Iron Mountain Butcher. He was arrested for robbing a train in 1893 and served 5 years. He was champion of America before going to jail.
 Quinn was Cornish wrestling champion of the Pacific coast in 1892.
 Ole Marsh had a well known match in 1899 with John Sugget for a purse of $2k.
 John Sugget had a well known match in 1899 with Ole Marsh for a purse of $2k.
 Joseph Martin, originally from Castle Gate, Cornwall, was Cornish wrestling champion of Toronto in 1906.
 W Sampson, originally from Penzance, was Cornish wrestling champion of Toronto in 1907.

Cornwall
 Stanton became the Cornish wrestling champion of Cornwall at a tournament in Penzance in the fifteenth century.
 John Goit was a friend of Richard Carew who states that during the reign of Elizabeth I, he had a claim to be the best wrestler in Cornwall.
 The Vicar of Lanteglos-by-Fowey was described in 1586 as "the best wrastler in Cornwall."
 Lyttelton Weynorth wrestled several times before Charles II, being introduced by the Earl of Radnor. He was the champion wrestler of all England.
 Thomas Hosken of Cubert defeated Lyttelton Weynorth and was described as "the strongest man in the county."
 James Harris, of St Agnes, was commonly called "Skinner" and "beat all and sundry" and was the court wrestler of Charles II. He "shortened his days by the sport".
 William Nott from St Gorran was a farmer who had much competition success at the end of the 1600s and was known as the "philosopher".
 Charles Dawe from St Gorran was referred to by Thomas Tonkin (1678–1742) as being without equal in the early 1700s.
 William Pascoe (1722-1808), the parish clark of Sithney for 60 years, was the champion of Cornwall for many years.
 Thomas Pearce, wrestled throughout Britain in the mid-1700s.
 Abel Werry (?-1824), from Liskeard was for many years the champion wrestler of Cornwall.
 Absalom Bennetts from Probus is described as having won well over 42 gold laced hats during the 18th century. He won the Probus tournament seven years running.
 John Truscott (1766-1848), from Roche, was a champion Cornish wrestler, competing with an 'East Cornwall' style. He won a famous match with the Giant Jordan in 1813. His brothers, George (known as the 'Big Truscott') and Diggory (known as 'Young Truscott'), were also well known wrestlers.
 Richard Jolly (1782-1848) from Penscawen, St Enoder, was a successful wrestler between 1808 and 1816.
 Richard Parkyn (1772-1855), weighing 16 and a half stone, was a champion wrestler from St Columb Major and was known as The Great Parkyn. He was champion of Cornwall in 1806 and it was said that he was undefeated 20 years thereafter. He was dominant from 1795 through to 1811.
 Jacob Halls (1782-1876), born on the Biscovallick estate, St Austell was a very powerful farmer who won many gold laced hats in his youth.
 John Collings (1783-1869) from St Minver was a celebrated wrestler in his early life. He also had a famous wrestling brother called Thomas.

 James Polkinghorne (1788–1851) born at St Keverne was a champion wrestler who had a number of famous contests against Devon fighters, including Flower, Jackman (1816) and Abraham Cann (1826), which drew very large crowds of spectators (c17,000).
 Abraham Bastard (1789-1868), born in St Teath, beat Polkinghorne in a famous match at St Kew in the 1820s. He later became a preacher.
 Francis Olver had much success in the early 1800s, including at least once beating Abraham Cann, James Cann and Finney. HIs brother also wrestled.
 James Warren (1786-?) from St Just was a famed Cornish wrestler, who became champion of Cornwall. He was known as 'Little Jem Warren' or 'Little Hercules' due to being 5 feet 7.5 inches high or 'Great Jem' from having prodigious strength. He distinguished himself in the rescue of survivors when the East Indiaman ship, "Kent" caught fire.
 Thomas Nicholas (1816-?) was 3 feet eight inches high and weighed about fifteen stone and was considered champion of the West of Cornwall and perhaps of all of Cornwall between 1835 and 1838. He trained Gundry and was known as "Tom Pike".
 Tom Magor from Breage was for some time All England Champion in the early 1800s. He trained Gundry and was a miner at Wheal Vor.
 Captain Thomas Gundry (1816-1888), of Wendron, was 5 feet 9 inches high, weighed 178 lbs and was a very famous champion wrestler in the 1830s and 1840s. His father was "Boxer" Gundry and his mother was from the Giddles wrestling family. He was trained by Tom Magor and Tom Nicholas. His wrestling record comprised at least 25 tournament wins and 5 second placements from tournaments in Cornwall, Devon and London. He was 7 times Cornish champion. He was the champion wrestler of all England. He was called champion wrestler of the world in 1847. He was married four times. In 1870, along with a wrestler called White, Tom rescued six or seven lives from a raging sea.
 John Roberts (1820-1892) known as "Johnnah" or "John-a" and born at Newtown, Ludgvan, was as famous champion heavyweight wrestler in the 1840s and 1850s, that more than once beat Gundry. After one such occasion, at the Penzance tournament, he was marched from one end of the town to the other accompanied by the mayor, several dignitaries and a band. He was subsequently the "quiet and unobtrusive" landlord of the "Old Inn" at Gulval for 30 years.
 William Delbridge (1823-1886) was originally from St Agnes and was lightweight champion of Cornwall in 1857. He then emigrated to Australia, where he was a respected stickler at many tournaments. He became the owner of a well known vineyard.
 Captain Joseph Hodge (1824-1909) was champion of Cornwall in 1839 and London champion in 1848.
 William Couch Jeffery (1826-1899), from Long Rock was champion middleweight of Cornwall for a quarter of a century including the 1840s and 1850s. He won many prizes in Cornwall as well as London. He was initially a miner and then a market gardener and fisherman. He spent some time in Australia and it was said that he had beaten the Australian champion wrestler, who was an Irishman after walking 160 miles to the match.
 James Bullocke, from St Austell, was champion wrestler who was champion of Cornwall in 1860 having defeated Treglown.
He won the London title in 1854 and 1859. He won the West of England title in 1853. He was the American champion in 1856. He died of consumption in St Mewan. He also wrestled in Europe.
 John Murton was lightweight champion in the mid-1800s.
 Polmear was a champion Cornish wrestler in the 1860s.

 Joseph Menear (1838-?) was born in St Austell and won the London Cornish wrestling title for over 10 years in a row and won over 100 prizes, cups, belts and medals. He had a brother John who had some wrestling success.
 William Pollard from Linkinhorne won many tournaments from the mid to late 1800s.  He became champion of England. He was 6 feet 2 inches high and weighed 220 pounds. He was champion of Cornwall for seven years to 1869.
 Samuel Rundle (1847-?), of St Austell, weighing 7 st 10 lbs and known as "Sammy Short", was all England Cornish wrestling champion in 1874, retaining the title for 20 years. He was champion of England in 1876 and in 1883 and in 1898 had been champion of England for "many years". In 1884 he had been champion of Devon and Cornwall for 12 years. Sam also wrestled successfully in the United States.
 Philip Hancock (1846-1927) of St Austell was the World Cornish Wrestling champion in 1884, winning the "open to the world" belt in Penzance.  He was known as "Phep", "Phip" or the "fat'un". He was 5 ft 9in and won the champion belt of Devon and Cornwall, wrestling in front of the Prince of Wales.  He claimed that he was never thrown or beaten in 28 years in competitions across the UK. He helped build the Eddystone Lighthouse and the Wolf Rock Lighthouse.
 Captain Samuel Coombe (1849-?), from Bugle, known as "Sammy", was a very strong wrestler who had some famous bouts with Hancock, who said he was as good a wrestler as he ever faced. He was heavyweight Cornish wrestling champion of Cornwall. When Sammy ceased wrestling he became a renowned Methodist preacher after teaching himself to read and write from reading the bible.
 Richard Williams (1851-1892), born in Chacewater, 5 feet 6 inches high and weighing 144 lbs, was known as 'Schiller Williams' after surviving the wreck of the Schiller and helping save some of the other few survivors. He was a well known, champion wrestler in Cornwall, the US, England, Northern Ireland, Bolivia and Mexico. He was Western states champion in the US and was lightweight champion of Cornwall. He died in Mexico.

 Thomas Stone (1852-1937) of St Austell, was a well known wrestler, who won over 20 tournaments in the mid to late 1800s. He was wrestling champion of Cornwall in 1896 and 1899. He wrestled in front of King Edward VII, who gave him a sovereign that he kept as a keepsake. His brother Henry was also an accomplished wrestler and was champion of Cornwall in 1891 after Tom had been disqualified. He was a worker in the china clay industry.
 Thomas Bragg (1852-1924) was born in Foxhole and was champion of America in 1866, 1876, 1879, 1880, 1882, and 1883. He was champion of Cornwall in 1882. He was champion of England in 1887. He also fought under the name, "Dan Lewis, the Strangler", in other wrestling styles, both in the UK and in Europe.
 John Pearce (1859-1896), from Wendron and known as "Jack", was the champion of Cornwall in 1887 and held the title for 6 years.  He won over 24 tournaments in England and the United States. John also claimed to be world Cornish wrestling champion in 1884, 1886, 1887, 1888, 1889, 1893 and in 1894. He had brothers Nicholas and Walter who had some wrestling success.
 John Capell (1859-1932), from Talskiddy, St Columb, was heavyweight champion of Cornwall in 1890 and 1898 and Champion of the West of England in 1890.
 Alfred Ernest Trenoweth (1868-1942) from Falmouth was well known as light weight champion wrestler of Cornwall. He was a carpenter and joiner and was also lightweight boxing champion of Kent.
 James Matthews, from Chapel Street, St Day, was a champion wrestler, who is especially notable, since he only had one arm!
 Jeffries from St Mewan was Cornish wrestling champion of America.
 Earnest Small, from Penzance, was West of England champion in 1906. He was Cornish champion in 1906 defeating Sidney and Reuben Chapman. He defeated Ahmed Madrali.
 Reuben Chaman (1881-1930), known as "Reub", from the famous Chapman family of St Wenn that has  won many titles throughout the last century, was champion of Cornwall from 1903 to 1910 and in 1914. He was a rabbit trapper as a young man. He also fought and won matches in the US.
 Sidney Chapman (1889-?), from the famous Chapman family of St Wenn that has  won many titles throughout the last century, won the championship of Cornwall in 1903, 1907, 1912, 1913, 1919 and 1920. He beat Tim Harrington in 1909 and was the middleweight champion of the US in 1910. He was awarded a medal by the Transvaal wrestling association in 1911 for his wrestling in South Africa and was the champion of South Africa in 1912.
 Francis Gregory (1904-?), from Roche, was a champion Cornish wrestler in the 1920s and 1930s who won the heavyweight title 9 times in a row and the interceltic title 7 times in a row.  He was champion of Britain in 1934. He was a famous sportsman, being a professional wrestler and boxer, who played league and union rugby (including for England). He participated in the first televised wrestling match and wrestled Billy Holland in a scene for the film "Lady of Pendower".

Devon 

 John Ridd, from Devon, held the championship belt for Devon and Cornwall in about 1685.
 John Coppe, known as "Little Cock", came from near Great Torrington, was about 5 feet 5 inches high and bow-legged and in the middle of the 18th century was champion throughout Devon, Somerset and Cornwall, for about 20 years.
 William Wreyford (1755-1838) from Cheriton Bishop was one of the best wrestlers in the Western counties if not in all England at the end of the eighteenth century.
 William Ford (1784-1874), from Zeal Monachorum, was a wrestler of great reputation in North Devon.
 John Jordan (1787-?), from Grantham near Hatherleigh and known as "Giant Jordan" or the "Devonshire Giant", was a famously massive champion wrestler from Devon who was 6 feet 4 inches tall. He fought in the early 1800s and had a series of famous matches with Cann. He was champion of Devon in 1811 and 1812. He also had famous matches with the Great Parkyn (1811) and John Truscott (1813), both of which he lost.
 William Wreford (1793-1835), who lived at Cheriton Cross between Okehampton and Exeter, was 5 feet 10 inches tall and was a sightless champion in the early 1800s. He was known as 'Blind Bill'. He was always allowed a grip on his opponent's collar at the start of a hitch.
 John Bolt (1793-1875), from Cheriton Bishop, was a champion wrestler throughout Britain and was Cann's second in his fight with Polkinhorne.
 Charles Cleeve of Kenton was champion of England in 1827.
 William Wreford (1793-1866) was born at Morchard Bishop was a champion Devonian wrestler of whom Abraham Cann said he was the "best best man he ever took by the collar". He came to fame after throwing Giant Jordan at the Crediton competition in 1812.

 Abraham Cann (1794-1864) was born in Crediton and was a famous wrestler who had an infamous wrestling match with James Polkinghorne. He was the champion wrestler of England. It was claimed that he became champion of the world. His father, Robert, and brothers: James (?-1849), Robert, George and William were also successful wrestlers.
 James Truscott (1804-1891), born on West Street, Tavistock and often called 'Jemmy', weighing 10st (63 kg), claimed to be the English lightweight champion in 1845. He later managed many wrestling matches and tournaments in London and tended to open the events with a shout of "A hat! A hat!". He was also a boxer and was one of the founders of the Patriotic Club at Clerkenwell Green.
 William Chapple from Bishop's Nympton, was champion of Devon in 1841, 1844, 1845 and 1847. He was champion of England in 1842 and 1847.
 William Davy May (1817-1842) was champion of England in 1841. During his career, he threw the best men of Devon and Cornwall, including the Gundrys, Ellicombe, Matthews, Chapple and Upton.

 John Slade, known as 'Jack Slade', held the Devon title for many years in the mid 19th century. He won the Prince of Wales Cup and the Duke of Cornwall Cup and a large number of tournaments and matches. He was all weights champion of England in 1860.
 Thomas Cooper (1823-1875), born at Sampford Courtenay, won many tournaments and was the four Western counties champion in the 1860s through to 1870. He was champion of West of England in 1859, 1869 and 1870. and reported to be champion of England in 1869. He was champion of Devon in 1852, 1858, 1870, 1873 and 1874. He had a brother John, 3 years his senior, who had some tournament success and who lived on the farm where Abraham Cann was born.
 Frank Hutchings from Moreton was Cornish wrestling champion of England in 1877, beating Phil Hancock.
 Robert Baker (1847-?) of Bow was champion of England in 1879, throwing Pike in the 10th round of the second day. He was also Devon champion in 1879. He had a brother Thomas who also had some success.
 Richard Pike (1850-?) of Bow was a champion wrestler in the 1880s and 1890s and was referred to as the "great Pike". He was about 6 feet 2 inches high and weighed 244 lbs. He was champion of Devon in between 1878 and 1881. He was champion of England in 1882. He was world champion in 1894. He was West of England champion for 17 years.
 John Stentiford (1862-?) from Drewsteignton was in the Royal Marine Light Infantry, weighed 14 stone 4 lbs and was 5 feet 9 inches high. He won many first prizes in tournaments towards the end of the 1800s in Devon and Cornwall, including beating John Capell. He lost a title match for the world championship in 1888 against Jack Pearce after wrestling over two days.
 Samuel Battershill of Bow was champion of Devon from 1885 through to 1887.

Egypt
 Mustapha Hambdi was an Egyptian wrestler who competed in Cornish wrestling competitions in Britain in the 1920s. He was middleweight champion of the world in catch as catch can wrestling.

England (excluding Devon)
 Rev Richard Stevens (c1670-1727), fellow of King's College, Cambridge and proctor of the university (1691), was a well known Cornish wrestler in the 17th century.
 Sir Thomas Parkyns (1664-1741) learnt his Cornish wrestling in Gray's Inn in London before writing one of the first books giving detailed instructions on hand-to-hand combat using Cornish wrestling techniques.
 Richard Rowe, originally from Cornwall, took up his residence at Cambridge University in 1740. Both he and his son were famous wrestlers and botanists.
 Charles Layton was the Norfolk champion from 1817 to 1827.
 Clargo (also spelt Claggo in the newspapers) claimed to be the Berkshire Cornish wrestling champion in 1828.
 William Matthews was champion of Dorset in 1841 and in 1842.
 John Goodman of the Blues was the London champion in 1845.
 Tom Cannon (1852-?) was a world champion Greco-Roman wrestler, who wrestled in Cornish wrestling matches in the late 19th and early 20th centuries, including winning a tournament, beating 22 other competitors. He wrestled in the UK, the US, France and Australia in many wrestling styles, including becoming world Greco-Roman wrestling champion in 1886 and 1894.
 Tom Waters claimed to be the Cornish wrestling champion of the North of England in 1884.
 Jack Wannop (1854–1923) was champion of London in 1892. He wrestled in other styles in the UK and United States. He was also a boxer.
 Joe Faulkner was 12 stone champion of the world in 1895.
 Charles Cawkell was a member of Britain's first international judo team who, along with Tani, competed in Cornish wrestling tournaments in the late 1920s, but with limited success.

Estonia
 Georg Karl Julius Hackenschmidt (the "Russian lion" weighing over 25 st, or about 160 kg) defeated the Australian Cornish wrestling champion, Delhi Nelson (three times) and the South African Cornish wrestling champion Grotz, in 1905. Hackenschmidt was a champion of many wrestling styles.

Finland
 Karl Lehto, from Finland, competed in Cornish wrestling matches and tournaments in America in the early 1900s.

France
 Fleure was a champion French wrestler who competed in Cornish wrestling competitions in Britain at the highest level in the early to mid 1800s.
 Henri was a noted French wrestler in the mid-1800s.
 Piere Maison fought in Cornish wrestling matches in London in the mid-1800s.
 M Bazar lost to Sam Rundle, in Paris, in a Cornish wrestling match in 1876. He was wrestling champion of France at the time and weighed 300 lbs.
 Delmas Pierre was a Frenchman that fought in Cornish wrestling tournaments in America in the 1890s.
 Dubois was a French wrestler who weighed nearly 22 stone, who was beaten by Sam Rundle.

Germany
 Herman was a German who competed in Cornish wrestling matches in Australia in the 1870s with some success.
 Carl Moth from Germany competed in mixed style wrestling matches in the US involving Cornish wrestling in the 1880s.
 Carl Schmidt, known as the "Germany Hercules", competed in mixed style wrestling matches in the US involving Cornish wrestling in the 1890s.
 Fisher was a German who competed in challenge matches in America involving Cornish wrestling. For example, he beat M J Dwyer in 1898, but lost the return match in the same year.
 Hillebrand, the "German Samson", was a strongman who toured America at the start of the 1900s and participated in some high-profile Cornish wrestling matches with the likes of Sid Varney.

 Joe Ziehr, from Germany, fought mostly in the United States and held the world Cornish wrestling heavyweight title between 1906 and 1911. In 1902 he was the heavyweight champion of the United States. Prior to this he had been a professional ice hockey player and played for the Calumet Miners.

Greece
 Dr John Theodore Hatzopulos, known as "Greek George", was a champion wrestler of many styles including Cornish wrestling. He was 6 ft 2 inches high and weighed 188 lbs when in condition. He wrestled throughout the world.
 Bill Demetral was Greek, who fought in Cornish wrestling tournaments in Michigan in the early 1900s.

Holland
 Dutcher was a wrestler of "some importance" from Holland that wrestled in Cornwall in the 1890s.

Ireland
 Saffney was champion of Ireland in 1826 and fought with Cann in 1826.
 Philip Gaffney, the "Irish giant", was an Irish champion in the early 1800s. He was champion of Ireland in 1827. He was London champion in 1828.
 Finney was a tall Irish champion in the early 1800s who at least once defeated Abraham Cann.
 Larkins was the Irish champion in 1827.
 Moorish of the 4th Royal Irish Dragoon Guards was 5 ft 5in high and competed at the highest level in the early 1800s.
 Simon Finn (1812 won the all-weights championship belt at the first annual meeting of the Devon and Cornish wrestling Society at Lambeth in 1849. He was the Irish champion in 1847 and in 1849.
 Flyn was a highly regarded Irishman that wrestled in Cornish wrestling tournaments in London in the mid-1800s.
 McMahon was the Irish champion who fought in America in the 1870s.
 Molly Russell, was Lady Cornish wrestling champion of the world in 1904. She was a crack shot, fencer and fought in other wrestling styles.
 Pat Connolly was an Irish champion that fought successfully in Cornish wrestling tournaments in Michigan in the early 1900s.

Italy
 Charles Salotti was an Italian Cornish wrestler that fought in America in the early 1900s and won various tournaments.

Japan

 Matsuda Sorakichi (1859-1891) competed in mixed style wrestling matches in the US, including Cornish wrestling, in the 1880s.
 Yukio Tani (1881-1950) was a famous Japanese ju-jitsu and judo wrestler who competed in Cornish wrestling competitions in Britain in the late 1920s.

Mexico
 Don Pardo, originally from France and known as the "great Pardo", was a noted Mexican Cornish wrestler in the late 1800s. He was a world famed bicyclist
 Professor Willie, originally from San Francisco - 6 feet high and weighing 176 pounds, was a noted Mexican Cornish wrestler in the late 1800s.

New Caledonia

 Philip Trenberth was the Cornish wrestling champion of New Caledonia in 1878.

New Zealand
 Richard Cox was the Westland Cornish wrestling champion in 1868.
 Francis Griffiths (1844-1910) was the Cornish wrestling champion of the West coast of New Zealand for several years.
 Edward Blackburn (1844-?), born in Cumberland, 5 feet 7 inches high and weighing 182 lbs, had much success in New Zealand Cornish wrestling tournaments. He also competed successfully in Australia. He was originally a catch as catch can wrestling champion in England before emigrating. He drew a Cornish wrestling match with Sam Rundle in 1874.  
 Thornton was the Cornish wrestling champion of New Zealand in 1882.
 Coghlan was champion wrestler of New Zealand in 1887.
 Robert James Scott, Cornish wrestling champion of New Zealand defeated Australian champion Delhi Nelson in 1905 to become the Cornish wrestling champion of Australasia. Note that he was arrested after this match for deserting his wife. He was 6 ft 3 inches and weighed over 14 stone.
 Harry Pearce was Cornish wrestling champion of Australasia in 1908.

Poland
 J Rogers of Polish extraction fought in Cornish wrestling competitions in Australia in the 1890s.

Scotland

 Duncan C Ross (1856-1919) was a famous Scotch athlete who was the Cornish wrestling champion of New Zealand in 1891. He also fought in mixed style challenge matches including Cornish wrestling in the US in the 1890s. He also claimed the all round championship at wrestling and weight throwing.

South Africa
 Bill Irwin (1855-?) was heavyweight champion of South Africa from 1897 before losing the title to Phil Mitchell in 1905. He also fought in Britain, for example losing a match to Jack Pearce.
 Phil Mitchell, born at East End, Redruth and weighing 197 lbs, was a famous heavyweight Cornish wrestling champion of South Africa. He was the heavyweight Cornish Wrestling champion of South Africa in 1904 and 1905.
 William Prynne (?-1931), Originally from St Stephen-in-Brannel and known as "Bill", was the Cornish wrestling champion of South Africa. He won 4 silver cups, a silver rose bowl and 2 cases of cutlery amongst other smaller prizes in South African tournaments.
 "Nick" Hocking, weighing 147 lbs, was the lightweight Cornish wrestling champion of South Africa in 1905.
 Grotz was Cornish wrestling champion of South Africa in 1905.
 Tit Wills, originally from Lanner and weighing 140 lbs, was the middleweight Cornish wrestling champion of South Africa in 1906.
 James Henry Triggs (1873-1949), weighing 220 lbs, born at Four Lanes and known as "Jim", was the heavyweight Cornish wrestling champion of South Africa in 1905 and 1906. He was champion of Australia in 1905 and won many matches in the US. He held the heavyweight title for Cornwall in 1904 and was instrumental in setting up the CWA. He was also a regular manager and stickler for the Cornish contingent in Brittany. He also wrestled in Norway.
 Almond Giles (1872-?), weighing 125 lbs, was trained by Jack King and was the lightweight Cornish wrestling champion of South Africa, England and America in 1907. He was 1905 lightweight champion of South Africa. He was born in St Dennis, Cornwall. He won many tournaments in England and America. He was champion lightweight wrestler of Montana.
 Jack Rudd, weighing 152 lbs, was the middleweight Cornish wrestling champion of South Africa in 1905 and 1907. He was one of the best Cumberland wrestlers.
 Sam Ham (1880-1946), weighing 165 lbs, who was born in Condurrow near Camborne, was the 1910 middleweight Cornish wrestling champion of South Africa.
 W Littlejohn, originally from Gunnislake and weighing 220 lbs, known as 'tiny', was heavyweight champion of the Transvaal in 1910.
 Prynne Stevens, was the 1916 Cornish wrestling champion of South Africa.
 B Gregor was the heavyweight champion of South Africa in 1926.
 Cecil Coombes, originally from Redruth and weighing 197 lbs, regained the heavyweight title of South Africa in 1927, winning it for the fourth time.
 J Ocliffe was the lightweight champion of South Africa in 1927.
 T H Gregor (1894-1964) originally from Highway, Redruth arrived in South Africa in 1913 and won many Cornish wrestling trophies in South Africa. In 1953 he was still the undefeated heavyweight Cornish wrestling champion of South Africa.

Sri Lanka
 The Imajah was middleweight champion of Ceylon in 1894 and also competed in Cornwall.

Sweden
 Emil Anderson, known as the "terrible Swede", fought in the United States at the turn of the 20th century. He had a famous match, for the world title, with Rowett in 1899.
 Ole Olson from Sweden, wrestled in the United States and beat John Tippett in a well known match in 1904.

 Charles Dufstrom, also known as the "terrible Swede", fought in the United States and claimed the world Cornish wrestling title in 1912.

Turkey
 Hali Adali, the great Turkish wrestler weighing 263 lbs, had some success in Cornish wrestling at the turn of the 20th century including defeating Tom Harrington, Joe Ziehr and Jack O 'Neill in 1899. However, he was defeated in a Cornish wrestling match by Jack O'Neill during a visit to the United States in 1903.
 Mourad Alat, known as the "Terrible Turk No II", fought in challenge matches in multiple styles in Canada in the early 1900s.
 Ahmed Madrali, the famous Greco-Roman wrestler known as the "Terrible Turk", tried his hand at Cornish wrestling and was defeated by Earnest Small.

United States
 Joseph Taylor Williams (1830-?) was born in St Erth and fought in tournaments in Cornwall, Devon and California during the 1850s and 1860s. "He had not an equal in his day at anywhere near his weight." He was champion of the Pacific coast. He was known as "little" Joe Williams or "Shiers" Williams. He was also lightweight champion of Cornwall in 1873. He repeatedly beat Sam Rundle in the 1870s.
 Thomas Eudy (born in St Austell) was the California State Cornish wrestling champion in 1861.
 Joseph Lawrence came second in the Grass valley tournament in 1866. He was convicted of second degree murder in 1868.
 Bill Pellew (1838-1908), from Virginia City, Nevada was a miner and known as the "Pride of Comstock". He was Cornish wrestling champion of America in the 1870s.
 George Harvey (1843-?) was the Michigan Cornish wrestling champion in the 1870s. He was 5 feet 11 inches high and weighed 195 lbs.
 James H Williams (1845-1906) from Walkerville, Michigan and better known as "Belmont", was famous as a Cornish wrestler.
 William Alfred Williams (1850-1903) from Centreville, Michigan held the middleweight Cornish wrestling champion of the Pacific coast for years.
 James Delbridge (1851-?) was the Michigan lightweight Cornish wrestling champion in the 1870s. He was 5 feet 7 inches high and weighed 145 lbs.
 Tom Carkeek, born in Plain-an-Gwarry, Redruth was said to weigh 17 stone, was a champion of Cornish wrestling in the 1860s and was the world Cornish wrestling champion in 1875. It was said that he won 528 consecutive wrestling matches without defeat and won 88 prizes. He was champion of the Lakes in 1878.
 John Blydh (1854-?) born in Linkinhorne and weighing 186 lbs, beat Tom Carkeek in a celebrated match in 1878.
 James Gerry (1858-?) born in Linkinhorne, weighing 180 lbs and being 5 feet 11 inches high, beat the best men of America including Tom Carkeek. He also had some success in Cornwall, drawing a match with Sam Rundle.
 Ben Knight, from Darlington, held the Cornish wrestling championship belts for Wisconsin, Northern Michigan and Colorado during the 1880s.
 Johnny Smith, from Virginia City, claimed to be the Pacific coast Cornish Wrestling champion in 1884.
 James Pascoe claimed to be the Pacific coast Cornish Wrestling champion in 1884 and 1890. In 1990 he claimed the title of champion of America in the Cornish style. He was 5 styles wrestling champion of the world.
Peter Carlyon (?-1926), from Breage, was the world lightweight Cornish wrestling champion in 1876, having defeated Tom Carkeek. In 1886 and 1887 he was the lightweight champion of America. He also came to compete in the UK.
 Durham Ivey (1854-1894) was the Colorado Cornish wrestling champion in 1886. He died in a mine accident and was also a catch-as-catch-can wrestler.
 Richard Varcoe (1855-1910) was a Cornish wrestler with some success, that wat was murdered by James Scopacesa in Ishpeming, Michigan. His son John was also a "clever wrestler".
 Andrew Bearle was the Cornish wrestling champion of America in 1887.

 Evan Lewis (1860-1919), known as the "strangler", was a champion wrestler in various styles. In the early 1880s he competed in Cornish wrestling challenge matches with various opponents including Jack Carkeek, with whom he lost a series of matches. In the 1890s he competed in mixed style challenge matches, which included Cornish wrestling, including beating Jack King a couple of times. Note that his brother Rees Lewis also fought in Cornish wrestling challenge matches in the 1880s.
 Gus Stohl was champion of Montana and won a $5k prize to become champion of the West in 1890.
 Frank Joslin was the Pacific coast Cornish Wrestling champion in 1894.
 Joseph Jefford was the Pacific coast Cornish Wrestling champion in 1895.
 J W Jefford of Sonoma was the Pacific coast Cornish Wrestling champion in 1898.
 Louis Morgan was the champion Cornish wrestler of the North West in 1898. In 1899 he was champion lightweight Cornish wrestler of the world.
 "Jim" Jeffords of Grass valley was the Cornish wrestling champion of America in 1899.

 John Carkeek (1861-1924), known as "Jack", was the World Cornish Wrestling champion in 1886 (after beating Jack Pearce in a bout lasting over 5 hours), in 1887 (he separately fought Pearce where the outcome was contested and Pearce claimed that Carkeek bit off a portion of his ear, Bragg but drew with Hancock in a title match) and again in 1889 (beating Hancock and Pearce) through to 1901, 1904 (beating Tom Bragg) and 1905. He regularly wrestled in Britain and the USA. He also wrestled in Australia. He was born in Rockland, Michigan, died in Havana and was buried in New York. He also won the Pacific coast championship. He officially retired from wrestling in 1891, however was involved in competitions after this date. He was the son of Tom Carkeek and his mother was first cousin to the actor Sir Henry Irving. He was the champion of America in 1887, 1888 and 1900. In the US, he was originally trained by Thomas White from St Just. In 1888 he was arrested in Chicago for swindling a man out of several hundred dollars by means of a fake contest. In 1910, while using the name of Jack Fletcher, he was arrested in San Francisco as part of the Maybray gang involved with match fixing. In 1913 he pleaded guilty to attempted swindling.
 Robert Gilbert, from Anaconda, Montana was a heavyweight champion Cornish wrestler. In 1891 he was heavyweight Cornish wrestling champion of both Colorado and Montana.
 John H Rowett, born in St Austell, was known as Jack and the "Bessemer Giant" and gained the lightweight championship of the United States at the age of 16.  He won the world championship in 1896 from Jack King and defended the title until his retirement in 1911. Rowett regained his title in 1914 and 1915. He was champion of America in 1897, 1898, 1899 and 1909. He was a game warden.
 William Jones beat Jack Rowett twice in large stand alone matches in 1899, thereby claiming the championship of the world. Note that he had lost to Rowett in 1897.

 James Rodda was champion of California in the Cornish style from 1889 through to 1902. He was arrested on a charge of attempted murder after a gunfight with Robert Chase in 1902.
 Tony Harris was a USA Cornish wrestling Champion in the 1900s (coming from Butte, Montana), of which it was claimed that he was "the best man to ever wear a [wrestling] jacket". He was champion of the North West in 1896 and 1903.
 Prof Mike J Dwyer, from Hancock, Michigan and known as "Sonny" Dwyer, claimed the world Cornish wrestling title in 1902.  He had the distinction of teaching Cornish wrestling to the US president, Theodore Roosevelt.

 Martin Burns (1861-1937), born in Cedar County and known as "Farmer" Burns, beat Rowett in 1899 and lost to M J Dwyer in 1905 in Cornish wrestling matches. He was a famous catch wrestler.
 Frank Gotch (1877 - 1917) beat Jack Carkeek in a Cornish wrestling match, while Jack claimed to have the world Cornish wrestling title. Gotch was a champion of many wrestling styles.
 Jack O'Neill, beat Jack Carkeek and Hali Adali in the very early 1900s.
 Husson, was the Cornish wrestling champion of Arizona in 1904.
 Coon, was the Cornish wrestling champion of Arizona in 1904, after beating Husson in their return match.
 Fred Roeber was champion of America in 1907.
 John Tippett (1876-1910), known as Jack, lived in Butte, Montana, but was originally from St Austell and weighed 186 lbs. He was champion of Canada and Michigan. He claimed to be Cornish wrestling champion of America in 1908. He also had some wrestling success in Cornwall. He died in a cabin fire in Park City.
 Tim Harrington (1873-?) claimed the world Cornish wrestling middleweight title in 1903 and retained it until his death. In 1902, Tim was arrested on the charge of insanity. It took 5 policemen to subdue him. He had a brother Peter, who also has some wrestling success. Tim beat Frank Gotch in a Cornish wrestling match.

 William Martin (1875-1910), 'Billy' weighing 140 lbs, from Calumet, Michigan, was the lightweight world Cornish wrestling champion from 1898 until he died of pneumonia in 1910. In 1902 he was the middleweight champion of the United States. He also wrestled in Norway. In 1905 he was champion lightweight Cornish wrestler of Michigan.
 John Rowe was Sheriff of Gogebic County, City Marshal of Bessemer and in 1910 was the undefeated world champion of Cornish-style wrestling.
 Thomas Young was the 1911 Cornish wrestling champion of Arizona.
 Sid R Varney, born in Cleveland, claimed the world Cornish wrestling title in 1921. He fought Ahmed Madrali in 1898 and 1899. He was a blacksmith and a champion in other wrestling styles.
 Dick Johns, from Marquette was the lightweight Cornish wrestling champion of the world in 1921.
 Tom Richards, originally from Old Pound, Nanpean, was the 1926 middleweight champion of America.

Wales
 John Rowe was a Welsh champion Cornish wrestler during the 1870s.
 Richard Pike from Barry was West of England champion in 1895.
 Jack Lamnea, known as "Swansea Jack" and "Lemm" became all England Cornish style wrestling champion in 1903.
 Nancy Jones, was Lady Cornish wrestling champion of Wales in 1904.

Cornish wrestling throws
There are a number of Cornish wrestling throws that are taught in training classes, but each has many variants.

Championships
The following Senior Championships are fought annually in competitions across the Duchy, overseen by the CWA:

The following Junior Championships are fought annually in competitions across the Duchy:

 Under 18s Belt
 Under 16s Trophy
 Under 14s Trophy
 Under 12s Trophy
 Under 10s Trophy

Cornish Wrestling at the Royal Cornwall Show
The Cornish Wrestling Association (CWA) still features annually at the Royal Cornwall Agricultural Show. The Cornish wrestling tent can be found in the Countryside area very near to the west entrance. In the Cornish wrestling tent you will find an impressive display of Cornish wrestling trophies, belts, history, photos, books and DVDs. The wrestlers perform demonstrations of their style in the Countryside ring, usually twice a day for each of the three days of the show. The demonstrations feature most of the throws and moves of the Cornish style and also feature demonstration bouts usually with a variety of wrestlers from youngsters, girls, lightweights and heavyweights.

Outside Cornwall

Cornish wrestling is Cornwall's oldest sport and as Cornwall's native tradition it has travelled the world to places like Victoria, Australia and Grass Valley, California following the miners and gold rushes. In the city of Grass Valley, the tradition of singing Cornish carols lives on and St Piran's Day celebrations are held every year, which along with carol singing, includes a flag raising ceremony, games involving the Cornish pasty, and Cornish wrestling competitions.

See also

Cornish Wrestling Throws
List of topics related to Cornwall
Collar-and-elbow
Cumberland and Westmorland wrestling
Devon wrestling
Gouren
Francis Gregory
James Polkinghorne
Richard Parkyn
Scottish Backhold

References

External links
The Official Cornish Wrestling Association
About Cornish Wrestling
 An article on early Cornish Wrestling from the Journal of Western Martial Art
Cornish Wrestling by the BBC
Another article, from a reconstructionist web site.
article by Michael Tresillian 

Folk wrestling styles
Wrestling
Wrestling in the United Kingdom
 
European martial arts
Historical European martial arts